{{Album ratings
| rev1      = Allmusic
| rev1Score = 
|rev2 = Encyclopedia of Popular Music
|rev2score = 
|rev3 = MusicHound Rock
|rev3score = 
}}The State of Art is on Fire is an EP by American punk rock band Rocket from the Crypt. It was released in 1995 on Sympathy for the Record Industry. The album was the band's first release to include trumpet player JC 2000.

The EP was first released in 10-inch vinyl format in April 1995. The vinyl release is unusual in that side A is played at 33 rpm and side B at 45 rpm. The CD version, released in November 1996, contains two bonus tracks originally released on the vinyl single Rocket from the Crypt Plays the Music Machine. The EP is one of the few Rocket from the Crypt recordings to include a lyrics sheet.The State of Art is on Fire was the first of three releases by Rocket from the Crypt in 1995. The LP Hot Charity and album Scream, Dracula, Scream! were both also recorded and released that year, and singer-guitarist John Reis would later refer to these three records as a "trilogy".

Track listing
10" vinyl version
Side A (33rpm)
"Light Me"
"A+ in Arson Class"
"Rid or Ride"
"Human Torch"
Side B (45rpm)
"Ratsize"
"Human Spine"

CD version
"Light Me"
"A+ in Arson Class"
"Rid or Ride"
"Human Torch"
"Ratsize"
"Human Spine"
"Trouble"* (originally performed by The Music Machine)
"Masculine Intuition"* (originally performed by The Music Machine)

*Tracks 7 & 8 comprise the 7" Rocket from the Crypt Plays the Music Machine'' and appear on the CD release only.

Performers
Speedo (John Reis) - guitar, lead vocals
ND (Andy Stamets) - guitar, backing vocals
Petey X (Pete Reichert) - bass, backing vocals
Apollo 9 (Paul O'Beirne) - saxophone, percussion, backing vocals
JC 2000 (Jason Crane) - trumpet, percussion, backing vocals
Atom (Adam Willard) - drums

Album information
Record label: Sympathy for the Record Industry
Produced by Long Gone John
Back cover photo by Craig I. Dragfest
Insert artwork by Patrick Hamou

References 

1995 EPs
Rocket from the Crypt albums
Sympathy for the Record Industry EPs